Restless Spirits  - Big Band Ritmo-Sinfonica Città di Verona plays the music of Roberto Magris is an album recorded by jazz pianist Roberto Magris with the Big Band Ritmo-Sinfonica Città di Verona released on the Velut Luna label in 2009. The disc is dedicated to the music of Roberto Magris, arranged for a large orchestra and also includes, as guests, the trumpeter Massimo Greco and the percussionist Sbibu.

Reception

The All About Jazz review by Raul Da Gama awarded the album 4½ stars and simply states: "Almost a mirror of the journey of the soul in Dante Alighieri's classic 13th epic poem of eternal human exodus, The Divine Comedy. The journey takes souls and spirits through Purgatory and into Paradise. Therefore, the key is to succumb to the charms of the music and give in to its narrative. This is beautifully written and arranged, and constitutes a deeply profound meditative journey." The All About Jazz review by Jack Bowers simply states: " On Restless Spirits, Magris proves he is as proficient writing for a big band as he is for trios or quartets. He and the Big Band Ritmo Sinfonica Citta di Verona have designed an impressive album that is unlike any others you're apt to chance upon." The All About Jazz review by Jerry D’Souza simply states: " Magris uses a wide canvas for his compositions and his palette is rich in its colorful diversity. He daubs it with the stylistic impressionism of funk, ballads, the blues and African rhythms. And it all comes to life in the most exultant manner. Magris and the Big Band Ritmo Sinfonia Citta Di Verona combine for expressively exhilarating music that will linger long in the mind and heart. "  The Ken Franckling’s Jazz Notes included Restless Spirits – Big Band Ritmo-Sinfonica Città di Verona plays the music of Roberto Magris in the list of the 10 best new jazz releases of 2009.

Track listing
 African Mood (Roberto Magris) - 6:58 
 Blues For My Sleeping Baby (Roberto Magris) - 6:47 
 Peaceful Heart  (Roberto Magris) - 6:57 
 Ambiguous (Roberto Magris) - 9:48 
 Restless Spirits (Roberto Magris) - 7:44 
 Short & Shorter (Roberto Magris) - 6:35 
 Standard Life (Roberto Magris) - 8:36 
 Maliblues (Roberto Magris) - 6:36 
 Ambiguous (alternate take) (Roberto Magris) - 9:35

Personnel

Guest Soloists
Roberto Magris – piano e Fender Rhodes
Massimo Greco – trumpet
Sbibu – percussion

Musicians

Marco Pasetto – conductor and soprano sax (on 8)
Patrizia Ballardini – flute
Franco Lissandrini – flute
Beatrice Maistri – flute
Barbara Mazzon – flute
Giulia Realdini – flute
Elena Zavarise – flute
Matteo Costanzi – trumpet
Giorgio Fiorini – trumpet
Davide Gagliardo – trumpet
Sandro Gilioli – trumpet
Marco Sorio – trumpet
Giovanna Bissoli – soprano sax
Emanuele Ballini – alto sax
Paolo Girardi – alto sax
Paolo Pesenti – alto sax
Orazio Boscagin – tenor sax
Stefano Buttura – tenor sax
Sandro Avesani – baritone sax
Filippo Borgo – clarinet
Caterina Gatto – clarinet
Elisabetta Grego – clarinet
Alessandro Manfredi – clarinet
Nicola Zeggio – clarinet
Paolo Delaini – bass clarinet
Marco Finato – bass clarinet
Anna Vittoria Zanardi – bassoon
Saulo Agostini – trombone
Linda Anzolin – trombone
Gino Farenzena – trombone
Giorgio Morelato – trombone
Giordano Bruno Tedeschi – trombone
Ester Anzolin – French horn
Denis Cavallini – French horn
Graziana Marchioni – French horn
Marco Pallaver – French horn
Mario Cracco – tuba
Ivo Bonazzi – electric guitar
Daniele Rotunno - keyboards
Giuseppe Gasperini - electric bass
Luca Zoccatelli – electric bass
Giorgio Buttura – glockenspiel
Stefano Zuffellato – drums
Stefano Sartori – percussion

Production
 Marco Lincetto – executive producer and producer
 Marco Lincetto – engineering
 Giovanna Bissoli – painting
 Paolo Girardi – photography

References

Roberto Magris albums
2009 albums